Real is the 23rd album and 19th studio album recorded by Puerto Rican singer-songwriter Ednita Nazario.  The album was released by Sony BMG Norte on December 11, 2007 (see 2007 in music).  The first single of this album are No te Mentía (English: I Was Not Lying).   After the warm welcome to the first single, "No te Mentía", the album is ready to go to market on December 11.  "Real" includes a work by producer Jacobo Calderón, José Luis de la Peña, Tommy Torres, Cristian Zalles, Claudia Brant, Sebastián Krys, Andrés Castro, by himself Ednita Nazario, Homero Patrón, Armando Ávila (La 5ª Estación), Juan Carlos Noguel, Graeme Pleeth (Sonique) and Iker Gastamiza and Alejandro García. Is the album number 23 of Ednita, "Real", was recorded between London, Nashville, Mexico City and Miami. The album debuted at No. 1 in Billboard's Top Latin Albums and Top Latin Pop Albums, selling about 18,067 in one week. The album received nomination a "Latin Grammy Award for Best Female Pop Vocal Album" in the 9th Annual Latin Grammy Awards on November 13, 2008, losing to Cualquier Día by Kany García.

Track listing

Singles
 No Te Mentía (2007)
 Después de Tí (2008)
 No (2008)
 Alguien Más (2008)
 Hoy (2008)
 Cuando No Te Queden Lágrimas (2008)
 Todavía (2008)

Awards

Billboard Latin Music Awards

Latin Grammy Awards

Personnel
 Vocals – Ednita Nazario
 Featurings – Reily Barba, Natalia Jiménez
 Keyboards – Bob Patin
 Bass – Gary Lunn
 Guitar – Michael Spriggs (acoustic), Gary Burnette(electric)
 Percussion – Brian Fullen
 Engineer: Graeme Pleeth
 Vocal Producer – Cristian Zalles
 Background Vocals –  Cristian Zalles

Charts

Notes

References

2007 albums
Ednita Nazario albums
Spanish-language albums
Sony BMG Norte albums
Albums produced by Tommy Torres
Albums produced by Sebastian Krys